The Woman in Black is a 1983 thriller novel by Susan Hill.

The Woman in Black may refer to:

 The Woman in Black (play), a 1987 stage play based on the Hill novel
 The Woman in Black (1989 film), a television film based on the Hill novel
 The Woman in Black (2012 film), a film based on the Hill novel
 The Woman in Black: Angel of Death, a sequel to the 2012 film
The Woman in Black (1897), a play by H. Grattan Donnelly
The Woman in Black (1914 film), a silent film based on the 1897 play, directed by Lawrence Marston for Biograph Studios
 The Woman in Black, American title of E. C. Bentley's 1913 detective novel, published in Britain as Trent's Last Case  
 The Woman in Black (1948 novel), a novel by Leslie Ford
"Woman in Black" (Grimm), first-season finale of the television series Grimm 
Woman in Black (supernatural), a supernatural figure seen in Virginia and Tennessee in the early 1900s
The Women in Black, a 1993 novel by Madeleine St John

See also
Women in Black, a women's anti-war movement
Lady in Black (disambiguation)